Isabela's at-large congressional district refers to the lone congressional district of the Philippines in the province of Isabela for various national legislatures before 1987. The province elected its representatives province-wide at-large from its reorganization under Article 6 of the Decreto de 18 junio de 1898 y las instrucciones sobre el régimen de las provincias y pueblos for the Malolos Congress in 1898 until it was reapportioned in 1987 under Section 1 of the ordinance annex of the 1987 Constitution of the Philippines into a first, second, third and fourth district. It was a single-member district throughout the ten legislatures of the Insular Government of the Philippine Islands from 1907 to 1935, the three legislatures of the Philippine Commonwealth from 1935 to 1946, and the seven congresses of the Third Philippine Republic from 1946 to 1972.

On three occasions in its history, Isabela sent more than one member to the national legislatures who were also elected or appointed at-large. Three representatives were sent to the National Assembly (Malolos Congress) of the First Philippine Republic from 1898 to 1901, two representatives to the National Assembly of the Second Philippine Republic from 1943 to 1944, and three representatives to the national parliament of the Fourth Philippine Republic from 1984 to 1986.

After 1986, all representatives were elected from congressional districts.

Representation history

See also
Legislative districts of Isabela

References

Former congressional districts of the Philippines
Politics of Isabela (province)
1898 establishments in the Philippines
1986 disestablishments in the Philippines
At-large congressional districts of the Philippines
Congressional districts of Cagayan Valley
Constituencies established in 1898
Constituencies disestablished in 1901
Constituencies established in 1907
Constituencies disestablished in 1972
Constituencies established in 1984
Constituencies disestablished in 1986